Harold Wilkinson may refer to:
Harold Wilkinson (footballer, born 1926)
Harold Arthur Faulkner Wilkinson, Australia soldier and public servant

See also
Harry Wilkinson (disambiguation)